The 2012 Basingstoke and Deane Council election was held on 3 May 2012 to elect members of  Basingstoke and Deane Borough Council in Hampshire, England. 21 out of 60 seats were up for reelection; Popley East had two council seats up for reelection. The Conservative Party retained control of the council with 32 out of 60 seats, losing one seat to the Labour Party in Buckskin and losing another seat in Bramley and Sherfield to an Independent. Labour overtook the Liberal Democrats to become the largest opposition party and won two seats from them in Brighton Hill South and Brookvale and Kings Furlong.

Election result

Ward results

Basing

Baughurst and Tadley North

Bramley and Sherfield

Brighton Hill South

Brookvale and Kings Furlong

Buckskin

Chineham

Hatch Warren and Beggarwood

Kempshott

Kingsclere

Norden

Oakley and North Waltham

Pamber and Silchester

Popley East
Popley East had two seats up for re-election due to a vacancy. Thus, unlike the other wards, it elected councillors with plurality at-large voting rather than first past the post. If the top candidate method is used to gauge the number of votes for party (i.e. assuming the number of votes in support of a party is equal to the number of votes for its most popular candidate) instead of the raw vote, then the party's vote shares are: Labour 72.3%, Conservatives 16.2% and Liberal Democrats 11.4%.
]

Popley West

Rooksdown

Sherbourne St John

South Ham

Tadley South

Whitchurch

2012
2012 English local elections
2010s in Hampshire